Discoverer 35, also known as Corona 9028, was an American optical reconnaissance satellite which was launched in 1961. It was the last of ten Corona KH-2 satellites, based on the Agena-B.

The launch of Discoverer 35 occurred at 21:23 UTC on 15 November 1961. A Thor DM-21 Agena-B rocket was used, flying from Launch Complex 75-3-4 at the Vandenberg Air Force Base. Upon successfully reaching orbit, it was assigned the Harvard designation 1961 Alpha Zeta 1.

Images were recorded onto  film, and returned in a Satellite Recovery Vehicle just over a day after launch. The Satellite Recovery Vehicle used by Discoverer 35 was SRV-523. The SRV was successfully recovered. Apart from the presence of some emulsion on the images it returned, Discoverer 35 completed its mission successfully. It subsequently remained in orbit until it decayed on 3 December 1961.

References

Spacecraft launched in 1961
Spacecraft which reentered in 1961